Eric Curbelo de la Fe (born 14 January 1994) is a Spanish footballer who plays for UD Las Palmas. Mainly a central defender, he can also play as a defensive midfielder.

Club career
Born in Santa Brígida, Las Palmas, Canary Islands, Curbelo finished his formation with UD Telde, making his senior debut during the 2013–14 season, in Tercera División. On 20 August 2015, he signed a contract with Segunda División B side SD Leioa, but terminated his link in December after being rarely used.

On 28 December 2015, Curbelo joined UD Las Palmas, club he already represented as a youth, and was assigned to the reserves in the fourth division. On 2 January 2019, he was definitely promoted to the main squad in Segunda División.

Curbelo made his professional debut on 7 January 2019, starting as a right back in a 0–0 away draw against CF Rayo Majadahonda.

References

External links

1994 births
Living people
People from Gran Canaria
Sportspeople from the Province of Las Palmas
Spanish footballers
Footballers from the Canary Islands
Association football defenders
Segunda División players
Segunda División B players
Tercera División players
SD Leioa players
UD Las Palmas Atlético players
UD Las Palmas players